The Royal Bodyguard is a British television sitcom, written by Mark Bussell and Justin Sbresni, and starring David Jason, Geoffrey Whitehead, Timothy Bentinck and Tim Downie. A series of six episodes began on 26 December 2011, concluding on 30 January 2012. The first episode picked up more than 8 million viewers but the series soon declined in ratings. The series was heavily criticised by viewers and critics.

Background
The series was written by Mark Bussell and Justin Sbresni following the success of their BBC sitcom The Worst Week of My Life. The pair came up with the idea of a Johnny English-type character who had to defend the royal family, but ended up doing so in a comic fashion. The pair immediately decided to make the programme family-orientated: at this stage, they did not envision Jason as the lead character. BBC comedy commissioner Cheryl Taylor lured Jason to the role, after initially offering him the job of executive producer. The series became the first for several years in which Jason had performed his own stunts. Filming on the series began in June 2011, and concluded in November. The first episode of the series was broadcast on 26 December 2011.

Critical reception
Just hours after its broadcast, the first episode was heavily criticised by fans of Jason and viewers alike. Jim Shelley wrote "The Royal Bodyguard was, the BBC trumpeted, Sir David Jason’s first Beeb comedy since Only Fools & Horses finished in 2002 – that was nine years ago. This fact alone should have alerted all involved to the fatal flaw at the heart of this debacle – namely that it was relying on the viewer’s fondness for Del Boy. It was a classic example of blind faith in the production’s star name. The prospect of seeing the 71-year-old star playing a former guardsman who had seen action in Northern Ireland and had now been appointed to the presumably prestigious position of royal bodyguard after saving the Queen’s life stretched this fondness to breaking point. After about two minutes. Never mind that the plot’s entire premise was stupid – that he was the incompetent former head of security at Buckingham Palace car park. The standard of the comedy was excruciating. It was blatantly designed to cash in on the appeal of characters like Inspector Clouseau and Johnny English. But the idea that Jason could play a clown as well as Peter Sellers or Rowan Atkinson was the only funny thing about it."

Characters
 David Jason as Captain Guy Hubble – an ex-guardsman who has seen action in Cyprus and Northern Ireland, before becoming Head of Security at Buckingham Palace car park. He is appointed as Royal Bodyguard after saving the Queen's life in an apparent act of bravery on the day of the State Opening of Parliament.
 Geoffrey Whitehead as Colonel Dennis Whittington – Whittington is Hubble's boss. The Colonel (frequently shown wearing an Intelligence Corps tie) quickly realises that Hubble is a weak link in the security service, but is unable to fire him because Hubble somehow manages to keep pleasing the Queen and appease Sir Edward Hastings.
 Timothy Bentinck as Sir Edward Hastings – the top man in royal security. Colonel Whittington keeps approaching his boss with reports that Hubble is endangering royal security repeatedly and on a colossal scale, yet somehow Hubble comes out the other side of each disaster smelling of roses, meaning Sir Edward is unable to take any action.
 Tim Downie as Yates – young, efficient and dedicated Yates has been loyally serving in the Royal Household division for a number of years. He hoped to be promoted to the position of The Royal Bodyguard, but was pipped to the position by Hubble.

Episodes

DVD release
"The Royal Bodyguard" was released on DVD on 12 November 2012.

References

External links

2011 British television series debuts
2012 British television series endings
BBC high definition shows
BBC television sitcoms
Television series by Hat Trick Productions
English-language television shows
Television shows set in England